Dreamland Isfahan (Shahre Royaha in Persian:شهر رویاها) is an amusement park and resort in Isfahan, Iran built in 2014 by Municipality of Isfahan, Chinese company Fantawild for a total cost 60 billion tomans.

Locations 
There are three 3D film cinemas, a Worm Around rollercoaster among other rides.

References

Amusement parks opened in 2014
Amusement parks in Iran